Action theory may refer to:

 Action theory (philosophy), an area in philosophy concerned with the processes causing intentional human movement
 Action theory (sociology), a sociological theory established by the American theorist Talcott Parsons
 Social action, an approach to the study of social interaction outlined by the German sociologist Max Weber and taken further by G. H. Mead

It may also refer to a number of different types of social interactions and associations, including: 
 Affectional action
 Instrumental action
 Traditional action
 Value-rational action
 Communicative action
 Dramaturgical action
 Group action (sociology)